The Pamplin Sports Center is a 2,300-seat basketball and volleyball arena in Portland, Oregon which serves as the home of the Lewis & Clark Pioneers. Before the Pamplin Sports Center, the college had a 1,600-seat arena that featured a plywood court which was built in 1947, but it burned down in 1966. For the next three seasons the school's team had no home court and was forced to practice and play at several high school gymnasiums around the Portland metropolitan area. The Pamplin Sports Center was completed in 1962, and in 2007 it was renovated and two practice courts were added that could be hidden under the bleachers during games. The stadium features two Daktronics-brand scoreboards on each base line.  At the time of its construction, the Pamplin Sports Center cost US$2.2 million. It was constructed by Juhr and Sons from Portland. The stadium as named after Robert B. Pamplin, whose son sat on the board of trustees for the college at the time.

See also
 List of sports venues in Portland, Oregon

References

External links
 

Indoor arenas in Oregon
Sports venues in Portland, Oregon
Lewis & Clark College
Sports venues completed in 1968
1968 establishments in Oregon
Basketball venues in Oregon
College volleyball venues in the United States
College basketball venues in the United States